Jeffrey Ellis Mandula (born 1941 in New York City) is a physicist well known for the Coleman–Mandula theorem from 1967. He got his Ph.D. 1966 under Sidney Coleman at Harvard University. Thereafter he was a professor of applied mathematics at MIT and then of physics at Washington University in St. Louis. Today, he is responsible for the funding of science in the U.S. Department of Energy.

References

A timeline of mathematics and theoretical physics 1967 at superstringtheory.com
Federal Grants Alert: August 30, 2000 (Department of Energy (DOE)) at U.S. House of Representatives, Washington, DC 20515

21st-century American physicists
Washington University in St. Louis faculty
Washington University physicists
Washington University in St. Louis mathematicians
Harvard University alumni
1941 births
Living people